The William Smith Medal is a medal of the Geological Society of London, awarded for outstanding research in applied or economic geology. It was first awarded in 1977. It is named after William Smith.

Smith Medalists
Source: Geological Society

Twentieth century

Twenty-first century

See also

 List of economics awards
 List of geology awards
 Prizes named after people

References

Awards established in 1977
Awards of the Geological Society of London
Smith